The North District Council is one of the 18 Hong Kong district councils and represents the North District. It is one of 18 such councils. Consisting of 22 members, the district council is drawn from 18 constituencies, which elect 18 members, along with four ex officio members who are the Ta Kwu Ling, Sheung Shui, Sha Tau Kok and Fanling rural committee chairmen. The latest election was held on 24 November 2019.

History
The North District Council was established on 1 April 1981 under the name of the North District Board as the result of the colonial Governor Murray MacLehose's District Administration Scheme reform. The District Board was partly elected with the ex-officio Regional Council members and chairmen of four Rural Committees, Ta Kwu Ling, Sheung Shui, Sha Tau Kok and Fanling, as well as members appointed by the Governor until 1994 when last Governor Chris Patten refrained from appointing any member.

The North District Board became North Provisional District Board after the Hong Kong Special Administrative Region (HKSAR) was established in 1997 with the appointment system being reintroduced by Chief Executive Tung Chee-hwa. The current North District Council was established on 1 January 2000 after the first District Council election in 1999. The appointed seats were abolished in 2015 after the modified constitutional reform proposal was passed by the Legislative Council in 2010.

The North District Council is dominated by the rural forces and the pro-Beijing camp. The rural forces had been in control of the chairmanship until in 2008, when long-time councillor So Sai-chi of the Democratic Alliance for the Betterment and Progress of Hong Kong (DAB) became the council chairman. The DAB achieved majority of the seats in the 2011 District Council election, taking 14 of the 17 elected seats of the council. The DAB majority ended when the Hong Kong Federation of Trade Unions (FTU) councillors departed from the DAB in 2012.

The pro-democrats had established its presence in the late 1980s with Tik Chi-yuen and Wong Sing-chi of Meeting Point elected in the 1988 and 1991 election. Both of them became the Legislative Councillor for the Democratic Party. The pro-democrats achieved the majority of the elected seats in the 2003 tide of democracy following the 2003 July 1 march, but suffered setbacks in the 2007 and 2011 elections. In the 2011 election, the pro-democrats won only one seat, occupied by Democratic Party's Law Sai-yan in Luen Wo Hui. The pro-democrats regained a number of seats in 2015, with Democratic Party chief executive Lam Cheuk-ting won in Shek Wu Hui and was elected to the Legislative Council in the next year.

In the 2019 election, the pro-democrats took control of the council by taking 15 seats in a historic landslide victory amid the massive pro-democracy protests. The pro-Beijing parties almost lost all their seats, retaining only three seats with DAB's Lau Kwok-fan, the legislator for the District Council (First) functional constituency also being unseated. As a result, the newly elected Law Ting-tak became the first localist being elected as council chairman for the first time.

Political control
Since 1982 political control of the council has been held by the following parties:

Political makeup

Elections are held every four years.

District result maps

Members represented
Starting from 1 January 2020:

Leadership

Chairs
Since 1985, the chairman is elected by all the members of the board:

Vice Chairs

Notes

References

 
Districts of Hong Kong
North District, Hong Kong